Mystery Girl is an album by Roy Orbison.

Mystery Girl(s) or The Mystery Girl may also refer to:

Film and television
 The Mystery Girl, a lost 1918 American silent film directed by William C. deMille
 Mystery Girl (The Naked Brothers Band), a 2008 television film featuring the Naked Brothers Band
 Mystery Girls, a 2014 American television sitcom

Music
 "Mystery Girl" (song), by Alexandra Savior, 2016
 "Mystery Girl", a song by Atlantic Starr from Radiant, 1981
 "Mystery Girl", a song by Brad Whitford and Derek St. Holmes from Whitford/St. Holmes, 1981
 "Mystery Girl", a song by Jess Conrad, 1961

See also
 His Mystery Girl, a 1923 American silent film directed by Robert F. Hill